LUCID (Langton Ultimate Cosmic ray Intensity Detector) is a cosmic ray detector built by Surrey Satellite Technology Ltd and designed at Simon Langton Grammar School for Boys, in Canterbury, England. Its main purpose is to monitor cosmic rays using technology developed by CERN, and will help predict the occurrence of solar flares (proton storms) which disrupt artificial satellites. LUCID was launched on 8 July 2014 at Baikonur, Kazakhstan as an instrument of the satellite TechDemoSat-1, which was carried into space by a Soyuz-2 rocket.

Professor Larry Pinsky, Chair of Physics at the University of Houston, described the project in Symmetry Magazine as "like playing at being NASA or the European Space Agency, but they’re not really playing. They’re doing the real thing.”

Channel 4 News said of the LUCID project that "with this metal box, the school has outwitted NASA".

References

External links
Description of LUCID
From the Physics Lab to the Medical Industry to the Classroom: The Medipix Story

Cosmic-ray experiments